George J. Schwalbach (May 5, 1866 – May 11, 1966) was an American farmer and politician.

Born in the town of Harrison, Calumet County, Wisconsin, Schwalbach was a farmer and drilled wells. He was also president and general manager of the Darboy Butter & Cheese Company. Schwalbach served as  the Harrison town clerk and town chairman. Schwalbach also served on the school board as clerk. Schwalbach served in the Wisconsin State Assembly in 1921 and was a Democrat. Schwalbach died in a hospital in Kaukauna, Wisconsin and a few weeks of ill health and having just turning 100 years old.

Notes

1866 births
1966 deaths
People from Harrison, Calumet County, Wisconsin
Businesspeople from Wisconsin
Farmers from Wisconsin
Mayors of places in Wisconsin
School board members in Wisconsin
American centenarians
Men centenarians
Democratic Party members of the Wisconsin State Assembly